Robert Goode Southall (December 26, 1852 – May 25, 1924), was an American politician and lawyer, noteworthy as the U.S. representative from Virginia.

Biography
Born at Amelia Court House, Virginia, Southall attended the Washington Academy and High School of Amelia County, and was Deputy Clerk of Nottoway County in 1873 and 1874.

Southall graduated from the law department of the University of Virginia at Charlottesville in 1876. He was admitted to the bar in 1877, and commenced practice at Amelia Court House. He later served as prosecuting attorney for Amelia County, Virginia, from 1884 to 1902.

Southall served as delegate to the Democratic National Conventions in 1888 and 1896, and served as member of the Virginia House of Delegates from 1899 to 1904.  He was elected as a Democrat to the Fifty-eighth and Fifty-ninth Congresses (March 4, 1903 – March 3, 1907).

He then resumed the practice of law in Amelia County, Virginia, and served as a judge of the fourth judicial circuit court of Virginia from January 1912, until his death in Baltimore, Maryland, .

Southall was interred in Amelia Cemetery, Amelia Court House, Virginia.

Electoral history

1902; Southall was elected to the U.S. House of Representatives with 90.16% of the vote, defeating Independent R.T. Vaughan and Republican Thomas A. Jones.
1904; Southall was re-elected with 82.85% of the vote, defeating Republican Charles Alexander.

Sources

1852 births
1924 deaths
Virginia lawyers
University of Virginia School of Law alumni
Democratic Party members of the Virginia House of Delegates
County and city Commonwealth's Attorneys in Virginia
County clerks in Virginia
Democratic Party members of the United States House of Representatives from Virginia
People from Amelia, Virginia
19th-century American lawyers
Virginia circuit court judges